Sviyazhsky Kanton (Yaña imlâ زۈيە كانتونىٰ) was an administrative division (a сanton) of the Tatar ASSR in 1920–1927. The administrative center of the canton was the town of Sviyazhsk.

Sviyazhsky Kanton was created in the territory of former Sviyazhsky Uyezd following the creation of the Tatar ASSR in 1920.

By 1926 it had an area of 3,326 km and a population of 153 384, 64.3% of whom were Russians, 33.6%—Tatars, and 2.0%—Chuvashs.  

In 1926, the canton consisted of 8 volosts. In 1927, Sviyazhsky Kanton was abolished, and 4 districts (Nurlat-Achasyrsky, Sviyazhsky, Tenkovsky, Ulyankovsky) were created in its terrirtory.

References

External links

History of Tatarstan